Xiangyi Li is a Chinese scientist, and the current director and co-founder of the China Science and Technology Museum in Beijing, China. Li was awarded the 2013 UNESCO Kalinga Prize for his contributions to popularization of science.

Li previously served as the director for science popularization at the China Association for Science and Technology. During his tenure at the Association, he was responsible for promotion of science education among people in rural areas, and workers in factories and mines.

References

Living people
Chinese scientists
Directors of museums in China
Kalinga Prize recipients
20th-century Chinese scientists
21st-century Chinese scientists
Year of birth missing (living people)